L'amor coniugale (Conjugal Love) is an opera in one act by Simon Mayr set to an Italian libretto by Gaetano Rossi. It premiered at Padua's Teatro Nuovo on 26 July 1805.

Background and performance history

Like Beethoven's Fidelio, the libretto of L'amor coniugale is based on Jean-Nicolas Bouilly's French libretto for Pierre Gaveaux's 1798 opera Léonore, ou l'amour conjugal. Unlike Fidelio which focuses on the struggle for political liberty, Mayr's opera, also known as Il custode di buon cuore (The Good-hearted Jailer) and described in its libretto as a farsa sentimentale, focuses more on the interpersonal relationships between the protagonists and contains comic elements. Rossi condensed Bouilly's two-act libretto into one act containing 19 scenes and changed the setting from the Napoleonic Wars to 17th century Poland.

L'amor coniugale premiered at the Teatro Nuovo in Padua on 26 July 1805 in a double bill with the premiere of  La donna di spirito. It was then performed the following September at the Teatro San Benedetto in Venice. Although rarely performed now, it was revived at the Teatro Donizetti in Bergamo in November 1984 conducted by Bruno Moretti and in Germany at the 2004 Rossini in Wildbad Festival conducted by Christopher Franklin. The Wildbad performance used a revised score by Arrigo Gazzaniga and was issued by the Naxos Records label.

Roles

Recordings
Mayr: L'amor coniugale – live recording from the 2004 Rossini festival in Wildbad, Germany, with Christopher Franklin conducting the Württemberg Philharmonic Orchestra. Label: Naxos Records 8660198
Mayr: L'Amor Conjugale – recorded at the opéra de Massy, France, 2021, with David Stern conducting Opera Fuoco. Label: Aparté AP267

References

External links
 
 Work details and performance history, corago.unibo.it
 Gaetano Rossi's libretto for L'amor coniugale
 Libretto by Jean-Nicolas Bouilly for Léonore, ou l'amour conjugal (on which L'amor coniugale is based)

Operas by Simon Mayr
Italian-language operas
1805 operas
Rescue operas
One-act operas
Operas
Libretti by Gaetano Rossi